True Lies is an American action television series created by Matt Nix, based on James Cameron's film of the same name. It premiered on March 1, 2023 on CBS.

Premise 
The series revolves around a suburban housewife who discovers her computer consultant husband is a skilled international spy, which leads them to saving the world and their marriage.

Cast

Main
 Steve Howey as Harry Tasker
 Ginger Gonzaga as Helen Tasker
 Mike O'Gorman as Luther Tenet
 Erica Hernandez as Maria Ruiz
 Annabella Didion as Dana Tasker
 Lucas Jaye as Jake Tasker
 Omar Miller as Albert "Gib" Gibson

Guest
 Carlo Rota as Francois
 Andy Martin as Mikkel Rand
 Beverly D'Angelo as Director Susan Trilby
 Andrea Laing as Cherry
 Deneen Tyler as Mrs. Myers
 Liann Pattison as Donna
 Ray Gaspard as Lawrence
 Franco Castan as Taxi Driver
 Christian Juru as Valet
 John Jabaley as Fred
 Jenny Mercein as Professor Gilpin
 Jeremy Dean as Construction Crew Leader
 Jackson Hurst as Harold
 Matthew Lillard as The Wolf
 Tom Arnold
 Keith David
 Tom Connolly

Episodes

Development
In September 2010, multiple websites reported that James Cameron, writer/director of the 1994 film, was developing and executive producing with Rae Sanchini, through Lightstorm Entertainment and 20th Television, a True Lies television series with Dark Angel producer René Echevarria serving as showrunner and producer. In 2017, Fox planned to do a pilot of the series, with Marc Guggenheim as screenwriter, McG as executive producer and possible director. In May 2019, McG announced on Collider Live that the television series would air on Disney+.

On February 10, 2021, CBS announced a pilot order for the second attempt at a True Lies series adaptation, with Matt Nix writing the pilot and producing with Josh Levy via Flying Glass of Milk Productions. Mary Viola of Wonderland Sound and Vision executive produced, with Corey Marsh of Wonderland co-executive producing. McG was set to direct the pilot and executive produce via Wonderland. In March 2021, CBS moved the pilot "off cycle" to give the series producers more time to film the pilot later in the year.

By May 2022, the series was revived, with Anthony Hemingway replacing McG as the director of the pilot and subsequent episodes, before CBS picked up the series to air in the 2022–2023 broadcast season. Steve Howey and Ginger Gonzaga were cast in the lead roles, while Erica Hernandez, Omar Miller, Mike O'Gorman, Annabella Didion, and Lucas Jaye round out the supporting roles.

By February 2023, Matthew Lillard, Keith David, Jackson Hurst, and Tom Connolly were confirmed to have guest roles, while Tom Arnold is set to return from the 1994 film.

Release
True Lies premiered on CBS and Paramount+ on March 1, 2023. It was previously set to premiere on February 23, 2023. It will also be broadcast in Canada on CTV the same day as its US release.
In Australia, True Lies streams on Disney+ instead of Paramount+ as of March 1, 2023, the same day in the U.S.

Reception

Critical response
The review aggregator website Rotten Tomatoes reported a 38% approval rating with an average rating of 4.6/10, based on 16 critic reviews. The website's critics consensus reads, "Bland as gruel, True Lies might borrow the name of a cinematic blockbuster but retains none of the personality that would differentiate it from the crowded field of espionage romances." Metacritic, which uses a weighted average, assigned a score of 49 out of 100 based on 14 critics, indicating "mixed or average reviews".

Tania Hussain of Collider gave the series a negative review, writing "CBS is no stranger to adapting previous material for success, but True Lies falls flat in carving out its own identity". Tim Surette of TV Guide also gave a negative review, summarizing that "CBS's commitment to making True Lies such an easy-breezy, network-friendly series means that it will have to face some hard truths: The idea that we want everything adapted into a TV show is a lie." Fred Topel of United Press International similarly gave a negative review, concluding that the series "skips over some of the best parts of the True Lies story. The creative decision to make Helen a spy right away deprives the viewer of the fun of Helen figuring it out and Harry desperately trying to cover up his missions." Neal Justin of Star Tribune gave the series a lukewarm review, speculating that "those who crave their action without the blood will be tempted to give it a try. And they'll be back."

Ratings

References

External links 
 

2020s American drama television series
2023 American television series debuts
American action television series
CBS original programming
English-language television shows
Live action television shows based on films
Serial drama television series
Television series by 20th Century Fox Television
Television series by CBS Studios
Television series by Wonderland Sound and Vision